The 2015 Asian Artistic Gymnastics Championships were the 6th edition of the Asian Artistic Gymnastics Championships, and were held in Hiroshima, Japan from July 31 to August 2, 2015.

Medal summary

Men

Women

Medal table

Participating nations 
116 athletes from 16 nations competed.

 (12)
 (10)
 (10)
 (5)
 (6)
 (3)
 (12)
 (1)
 (12)
 (8)
 (1)
 (4)
 (12)
 (9)
 (4)
 (7)

References

 Results 1
 Results 2
 Results 3

Asian Artistic Gymnastics Championships
Asian Gymnastics Championships
International gymnastics competitions hosted by Japan
2015 in Japanese sport